Dalcerides ingenita is a moth in the family Dalceridae. It was described by Henry Edwards in 1882. It is found in the US from southeastern Arizona, north through the mountains to Flagstaff. It is also found in southwestern Texas and Mexico. The habitat consists of subtropical moist, subtropical dry, warm temperate moist and warm temperate dry forests, as well as warm temperate thorn steppe.

The length of the forewings is 9–13 mm for males and 12–16 mm for females. Adults are orange, although the hindwings are sometimes slightly richer in color than the forewings. Adults are on wing from late April to September in Arizona and from July to December in Mexico. In Arizona Dalcerides ingenita, along with the similar geometrid Eubaphe unicolor, is part of a mimetic complex modeled on Lycus loripes and Lycus simulans.

The larvae feed on Arctostaphylos pungens, Quercus emoryi and Quercus oblongifolia.

References

Moths described in 1882
Dalceridae